Lepeophtheirus is a genus of sea louse. The best-known species is L. salmonis, the salmon louse. Other species include L. pectoralis, which uses flatfish as its host, particularly the European flounder, and is also the type species of the genus Lepeophtheirus.

Species
Lepeophtheirus contains 122 species:

Lepeophtheirus acutus Heegaard, 1943
Lepeophtheirus aesopus C. B. Wilson, 1906
Lepeophtheirus alvaroi Suárez-Morales & Gasca, 2012
Lepeophtheirus anguilli Hameed, 1976
Lepeophtheirus appendiculatus Krøyer, 1863
Lepeophtheirus argentus Hewitt, 1963
Lepeophtheirus atypicus Lin et al., 1996
Lepeophtheirus bagri Dana, 1849
Lepeophtheirus bifidus Fraser, 1920
Lepeophtheirus bifurcatus C. B. Wilson, 1905
Lepeophtheirus bonaci Pearse, 1952
Lepeophtheirus brachyurus Heller, 1865
Lepeophtheirus breviventris Fraser, 1920
Lepeophtheirus bychowskyi Gusev, 1951
Lepeophtheirus chaenichthyis (Cunningham, 1871)
Lepeophtheirus chantoni Gusev, 1951
Lepeophtheirus chilensis C. B. Wilson, 1905
Lepeophtheirus clarionensis Shiino, 1959
 Lepeophtheirus confusum González, Castro, Muñoz & López, 2016
Lepeophtheirus constrictus C. B. Wilson, 1908
Lepeophtheirus cossyphi Krøyer, 1863
Lepeophtheirus crabro Krøyer, 1863
Lepeophtheirus crassus (Bere, 1936)
Lepeophtheirus cuneifer Kabata, 1974
Lepeophtheirus curtus (C. B. Wilson, 1913)
Lepeophtheirus dissimulatus C. B. Wilson, 1905
Lepeophtheirus distinctus Hewitt, 1963
Lepeophtheirus edwardsi C. B. Wilson, 1905
Lepeophtheirus elegans Gusev, 1951
Lepeophtheirus eminens C. B. Wilson, 1944
Lepeophtheirus epinepheli Ho & Dojiri, 1977
Lepeophtheirus erecsoni G. M. Thomson, 1891
Lepeophtheirus etelisi Ho, Chiang & Lin, 2009
Lepeophtheirus europaensis Zeddam et al., 1988
Lepeophtheirus exilipes Ho & Lin, 2003
Lepeophtheirus exsculptus Fischer, 1860
Lepeophtheirus formosanus Ho & Lin, 2010
Lepeophtheirus frecuens Castro-Romero & Baeza-Kuroki, 1984
Lepeophtheirus furcatus (Capart, 1953)
Lepeophtheirus goniistii Yamaguti, 1936
Lepeophtheirus grohmanni Krøyer, 1863
Lepeophtheirus hapalogenyos Yamaguti& Yamasu, 1959
Lepeophtheirus hastatus Shiino, 1960
Lepeophtheirus heegaardi Hewitt, 1963
Lepeophtheirus hexagrammi Gusev, 1951
Lepeophtheirus hidekoi Ho, 1962
Lepeophtheirus hippoglossi (Krøyer, 1837)
Lepeophtheirus histiopteridi Kazachenko et al., 1972
Lepeophtheirus hospitalis Fraser, 1920
Lepeophtheirus hummi Pearse, 1952
Lepeophtheirus intercurreus Krøyer, 1863
Lepeophtheirus interitus C. B. Wilson, 1921
Lepeophtheirus kabatai Ho & Dojiri, 1977
Lepeophtheirus kareii Yamaguti, 1936
Lepeophtheirus krishnai Kaliyamurthy, 1990
Lepeophtheirus lagocephali Pillai, 1963
Lepeophtheirus lalandei Kensley & Grindley, 1973
Lepeophtheirus lateolabraxi Shen, 1958
Lepeophtheirus latigenitalis Pillai & Natarajan, 1977
Lepeophtheirus lewisi Hewitt, 1971
Lepeophtheirus lichiae Barnard, 1948
Lepeophtheirus litus (A. G. Lewis, 1964)
Lepeophtheirus longiabdominalis Shiino, 1961
Lepeophtheirus longicaudus (Cressey, 1966)
Lepeophtheirus longipalpus Bassett-Smith, 1898
Lepeophtheirus longipes C. B. Wilson, 1905
Lepeophtheirus longispinosus C. B. Wilson, 1908
Lepeophtheirus longiventralis Yü & Wu, 1932
Lepeophtheirus marcepes C. B. Wilson, 1944
Lepeophtheirus marginatus Bere, 1936
Lepeophtheirus molvae Milne-Edwards, 1836
Lepeophtheirus monacanthus Heller, 1865
Lepeophtheirus mugiloidis Villalba, 1986
Lepeophtheirus muraenae Shiino, 1960
Lepeophtheirus nanaimoensis C. B. Wilson, 1912
Lepeophtheirus natalensis Kensley & Grindley, 1973
Lepeophtheirus nordmanni (Milne-Edwards, 1840)
Lepeophtheirus oblitus Kabata, 1973
Lepeophtheirus palliatus (C. B. Wilson, 1905)
Lepeophtheirus paralichthydis Yamaguti & Yamasu, 1960
Lepeophtheirus parvicruris Fraser, 1920
Lepeophtheirus parviventris C. B. Wilson, 1905
Lepeophtheirus parvulus Shiino, 1952
Lepeophtheirus parvus C. B. Wilson, 1908
Lepeophtheirus paulus Cressey, 1969
Lepeophtheirus pectoralis (O. F. Müller, 1776)
Lepeophtheirus perpes Leigh-Sharpe, 1934
Lepeophtheirus pharaonis (Nordmann, 1832)
Lepeophtheirus platensis Thomsen, 1949
Lepeophtheirus plectropomi Nuñes-Ruivo, 1956
Lepeophtheirus plotosi Barnard, 1948
Lepeophtheirus pollachius Bassett-Smith, 1896
Lepeophtheirus polyprioni Hewitt, 1963
Lepeophtheirus pravipes C. B. Wilson, 1912
Lepeophtheirus quadratus Krøyer, 1863
Lepeophtheirus remiopsis Dojiri, 1979
Lepeophtheirus renalis (Heegaard, 1945)
Lepeophtheirus rhinobati Luque et al., 1999
Lepeophtheirus robustus Krøyer, 1863
Lepeophtheirus rotundatus Brian, 1932
Lepeophtheirus rotundipes Dojiri, 1979
Lepeophtheirus rotundiventris Bassett-Smith, 1898
Lepeophtheirus salmonis (Krøyer, 1837)
Lepeophtheirus scutiger Shiino, 1952
Lepeophtheirus sekii Yamaguti, 1936
Lepeophtheirus selkirki Atria, 1969
Lepeophtheirus semicossyphi Yamaguti, 1939
Lepeophtheirus sheni Boxshall & Bellwood, 1981
Lepeophtheirus shiinoi Prabha & Pillai, 1986
Lepeophtheirus sigani Ho et al., 2004
Lepeophtheirus simplex Ho et al., 2001
Lepeophtheirus spatha Dojiri & Brantley, 1991
Lepeophtheirus spinifer Kirtisinghe, 1937
Lepeophtheirus sturionis (Krøyer, 1837)
Lepeophtheirus suhmi Brady, 1883
Lepeophtheirus tenuis (Leidy, 1889)
Lepeophtheirus thompsoni Baird, 1850
Lepeophtheirus tuberculatus I. H. Kim, 1993
Lepeophtheirus uluus (A. G. Lewis, 1964)
Lepeophtheirus unispinosus Pearse, 1952
Lepeophtheirus watanabei Shiino, 1954
Lepeophtheirus yanezi Stuardo & Fagetti, 1961
Lepeophtheirus zbigniewi Castro-Romero & Baeza-Kuroki, 1981

References

Siphonostomatoida
Copepod genera
Parasitic crustaceans
Taxa named by Alexander von Nordmann